Cameraria walsinghami is a moth of the family Gracillariidae. It is known from California, United States.

The length of the forewings is 4.5-5.5 mm.

The larvae feed on Lithocarpus densiflorus var. echinoides. They mine the leaves of their host plant. The mine is oblong and the epidermis is opaque yellow tan. The mines are usually found on both sides of the midrib or, rarely, to one side of the midrib on larger leaves. The mines are always solitary, with one or two short longitudinal folds, always at the edge of the leaf.

Etymology
The species is named in honor of Lord Walsingham (Thomas de Grey), a pioneer microlepidopterist who had collected extensively in the general areas of the type-locality during 1871-1872.

References

Cameraria (moth)

Moths of North America
Fauna of California
Lepidoptera of the United States
Moths described in 1981
Leaf miners
Taxa named by Paul A. Opler
Taxa named by Donald R. Davis (entomologist)